José Antunes Sobrinho (born 1962) is a Brazilian civil engineer and energy executive who specializes in hydroelectric and other energy projects. He holds a degree from the Federal University of Paraná (1974) and a Master's degree in hydraulic engineering from the Delft University of Technology, Netherlands (1978).

History 

In 1986, Antunes was appointed Director General of ENGEVIX Engenharia S/A.

Antunes has worked on the Itaipu (14,000 MW), Tucuruí Dam (8,370 MW), Belo Monte Dam (11,233 MW under construction); Ita Dam  (1,450 MW), Campos Novos Dam (880 MW), Barra Grande Hydroelectric Power Plant (690 MW) and other hydro projects.

Antunes is also an active consultant and provides local support for UK-based Coopers & Lybrand. He helped drive forward the Brazilian energy sector restructuring program, which basically set the foundations for the way the industry's regulatory and legal frameworks would operate.

Antunes was a member of the teams consulting on the Itaipu (14,000 MW) and Machadinho Hydroelectric Power Plant (1,240 MW) projects.  He has also worked on projects in Asia (Vietnam, China and Nepal), Africa (Congo, Angola and Namibia) and South America (Peru, Mexico and elsewhere).  In 2009, he was invited to lecture at MIT (the Massachusetts Institute of Technology) on renewable energy in Brazil.

In May 1995, Antunes founded DESENVIX, the investment arm of ENGEVIX that focuses on the energy industry. DESENVIX currently generates the equivalent of 400 MW provided by clean energy sources and ongoing or planned hydro, biomass and wind energy projects that will provide around 2,000 MW.

Antunes is currently managing the INFRAMERICA consortium, which is building the new Natal Airport (Rio Grande do Norte) and modernizing and expanding Brasília Airport,.

The ENGEVIX Group also has many maritime construction contracts and builds hulls for Floating production storage and offloading platforms.

References

Brazilian engineers
Living people
1962 births